Přemysl Bičovský (born 18 August 1950 in Košťany) is a Czech football manager and former player. He played 45 matches for Czechoslovakia. He was previously the manager of FK Ústí nad Labem in the Czech 2. Liga.

He was a participant in the 1982 FIFA World Cup.

He played for FK Teplice and later spent his best football years at Bohemians Praha.

Bičovský later began a coaching career with ASK Ybbs, FK Teplice, FC Chomutov, Lokomotíva Česká Lípa, SK Buldoci Karlovy Vary-Dvory, SIAD Braňany, FK SIAD Most, Chmel Blšany, MFK Ružomberok, SK Roudnice nad Labem and FC Zenit Čáslav.

References

1950 births
Living people
Czech footballers
Czechoslovak footballers
FK Teplice players
Dukla Prague footballers
UEFA Euro 1976 players
1982 FIFA World Cup players
UEFA European Championship-winning players
Czechoslovakia international footballers
Czechoslovak football managers
Czech football managers
FK Baník Most managers
FK Čáslav managers
FK Ústí nad Labem managers
Expatriate football managers in Slovakia
MFK Ružomberok managers
Czechoslovak expatriate footballers
Czechoslovak expatriate sportspeople in Austria
Expatriate footballers in Austria
Czech expatriate sportspeople in Slovakia
FK Chmel Blšany managers
Association football forwards
Czech National Football League managers